This is the discography of British electronic musician Fad Gadget, including releases under his actual name Frank Tovey.

Albums

Studio albums

Compilation albums

Singles

Other releases

References

Discographies of British artists
Rock music discographies
New wave discographies
Electronic music discographies